Marne is a town in the district of Dithmarschen, in Schleswig-Holstein, Germany.

Marne is the seat of the Amt ("collective municipality") Marne-Nordsee.

gallery

References

External links
 official homepage of Marne (de)

Dithmarschen